Gail Monroe Dack (March 4, 1901, Belvidere, Illinois – June 21, 1976, Kane County, Illinois) was an American physician and professor of bacteriology, known as a leading expert on food-borne illnesses.

Biography
Gail M. Dack graduated in 1918 from Elgin High School and in 1922 with a B.S. from the University of Illinois Urbana-Champaign. He graduated in 1927 with a Ph.D. from the University of Chicago and in 1933 with an M.D. from the University of Chicago Medical School (now named the Pritzker School of Medicine). In the University of Chicago's department of bacteriology, he was from 1925 to 1929 an instructor, from 1929 to 1937 an assistant professor, from 1937 to 1946 an associate professor, from 1946 to 1966 a full professor, and then a professor emeritus in retirement. From 1946 to 1966 he was also the director of the University of Chicago's Food Research Institute.  From 1952 to 1953 he chaired the National Research Council Committee on Foods.

In a classic 1930 paper, Dack and 3 colleagues published an account of food poisoning that occurred in Chicago in December 1929. Eleven people became sick with vomiting and severe diarrhea after eating, on slightly different occasions, three-layered sponge cake filled with cream. Separate, different, cake components were fed to monkeys and to human volunteers without ill effects. A thorough bacteriological examination of the cake substance yielded 19 different types of bacterial colonies — but the only type found to be of importance was a yellow hemolytic Staphylococcus. Using that Staphylococcus colony, the Chicago researchers prepared a sterile filtrate containing the bacterial enterotoxins. Injection of the filtrate into a rabbit caused death with severe diarrhea. Three human volunteers, namely the physicians William E. Cary, Edwin O. Jordan, and Dack, drank different volumes of the filtrate. Dack, who drank the largest volume, became violently ill, and the other two physicians had minor symptoms. Heat lability experiments established a heating protocol that safely destroyed the bacteria. Lawrence K. Altman, M.D., gave a brief, vivid account of this self-experimentation.

In addition to his research on staphylococcal food poisoning, Dack studied botulism, ulcerative colitis, and salmonella infection.

In 1917 Edwin O. Jordan, who later became Dack's mentor, published a 107-page monograph entitled Food Poisoning. After Jordan's death in 1936, Dack took responsibility for updates of the book and published his first version of Food Poisoning in 1943 with subsequent editions in 1949 and 1956.

In 1951 Dack was elected a fellow of the American Association for the Advancement of Science. He was the president of the American Society for Microbiology in 1953. He received in 1925 the Howard Taylor Ricketts Prize and in 1956 the Babcock-Hart Award. In 1957 he won the Pasteur Award of the Illinois Society for Microbiology.

Dack married Martha Pierson Bowsfield in 1926. They had two children.

Selected publications
  The term Bacterium necrophorum as used by Dack might be a synonym for Fusobacterium necrophorum, which can cause Lemierre's syndrome.

References

External links
 

1901 births
1976 deaths
American bacteriologists
University of Illinois Urbana-Champaign alumni
University of Chicago alumni
University of Chicago faculty
Pritzker School of Medicine alumni
Fellows of the American Association for the Advancement of Science